Horseshoes is a 1923 American silent comedy film featuring Oliver Hardy.

Cast
 Larry Semon as Larry
 Kathleen Myers as The Grocer's Daughter
 Oliver Hardy as Dynamite Duffy (as Babe Hardy)
 James Donnelly
 Spencer Bell

See also
 List of American films of 1923
 Oliver Hardy filmography

External links

1923 films
1923 short films
1923 comedy films
American silent short films
American black-and-white films
Silent American comedy films
Films directed by Larry Semon
American comedy short films
1920s American films